The Jupiters  were annual awards presented to science fiction writing annually for the preceding year during 1974 - 1978.  There were awards for the best novel, novella, novelette and short story.  They were presented by the Instructors of Science Fiction in Higher Education.

Winners

References

External links
 About the Jupiter Awards at The Locus Index to Science Fiction Awards

Science fiction awards